Jelena Janković and Katarina Srebotnik were the defending champions, but they chose not to compete together.  Janković played alongside Klára Koukalová, but lost in the second round to Michaëlla Krajicek and Barbora Záhlavová-Strýcová.  Srebotnik teamed up with Květa Peschke, but lost in the second round to Chan Hao-ching and Chan Yung-jan.
Sara Errani and Roberta Vinci won the title, defeating Cara Black and Sania Mirza in the final, 7–6(7–4), 6–3.

Seeds
The top four seeds received a bye into the second round.

Draw

Finals

Top half

Bottom half

References

Main Draw

Rogers Cup Doubles
2014 Rogers Cup
Rogers